Judy Versus Capitalism is a Canadian documentary film, directed by Mike Hoolboom and released in 2020. The film is an experimentally structured documentary portrait of the life of influential Canadian activist Judy Rebick, based in part on her memoir Heroes in My Head.

The film premiered in January 2020 at the International Film Festival Rotterdam, and had its Canadian premiere in May 2020 at the Hot Docs Canadian International Documentary Festival.

It was screened at Montreal's Festival du nouveau cinéma in October, winning the Grand Prix. In December, it was named to the Toronto International Film Festival's year-end Canada's Top Ten list for 2020.

References

External links
 

2020 films
2020 documentary films
Canadian documentary films
Films directed by Mike Hoolboom
2020s English-language films
2020s Canadian films